Dowlatabad (also Romanized as Dowlatābād) is a village in Zeberkhan Rural District, Zeberkhan District, Nishapur County, Razavi Khorasan Province, Iran. At the 2006 census, its population was 640, in 168 families.

References 

Populated places in Nishapur County